Anû Kathâ Îpa ( Bald Eagle Peak), is an outlier of Mount Charles Stewart in the Canadian Rockies of Alberta. It is one of the most prominent landmarks in the vicinity of Canmore, Alberta.

"Anû Kathâ Îpa" is the official  name for the high point of a ridge that lies southwest of the Mount Charles Stewart summit and northwest of Mount Lady Macdonald near Canmore. 
The peak was formerly known as "Squaw's Tit", owing to the resemblance it shares with a woman's upturned breast. On August 20, 2020 it was reported that the prominence would be renamed to avoid racist and misogynistic naming. The Stoney Nakoda were asked to help select a culturally appropriate name and a request to support the initiative was brought to the Municipal District of Bighorn in September 2020. It was officially renamed on September 29, 2020. 


Routes
For climbers, a scrambling route is graded moderate but includes exposure and thus is strongly recommended that the ascent only be done in dry conditions. Climbers are advised to follow the major drainage ditch behind Harvie Heights and stay close along the right (south) side of the ditch, and then to follow this up to the North West ridge all the way to the slabs just below the summit.

See also
 List of mountains in the Canadian Rockies
 Breast-shaped hill
 Mark Monmonier

References

Two-thousanders of Alberta
Alberta's Rockies